Paresh Kuh (also Romanized as Paresh Kūh and Porshokooh) is a village in Moridan Rural District, Kumeleh District, Langarud County, Gilan Province, Iran. At the 2006 census, its population was 1,070, in 323 families.

References 

Populated places in Langarud County